This is list of archives in Belgium.

Archives in Belgium 
  (city archives)
 Letterenhuis
 Mundaneum
 Liberal Archive (Belgium)
 Royal Museum for Central Africa archives
 State Archives in Belgium
 National Archives of Belgium
 
 Belgian National Archives 2 - Joseph Cuvelier repository
 Archives Africaines of the SPF Affaires étrangères, Commerce extérieur et Coopération au Développement
Center for Historical Research and Documentation on War and Contemporary Society

See also 
 
 List of libraries in Belgium
 List of museums in Belgium
 Culture of Belgium
 List of archives

Further reading

External links 

 
Archives
Belgium
Archives